This is a list of lap times achieved by various vehicles on the Nürburgring (Nordschleife). The list itself is broken down into categories.

The Nordschleife

Manufacturers publish times for promotional purposes while automotive media outlets usually publish times for comparison and reporting purposes. According to Car and Driver, Nürburgring Nordschleife "record-chasing runs are a universally accepted, objective measure of a car’s performance, and shaving seconds gives automakers reasons to grab some headlines." Compared to the current version, the original Nürburgring track was longer and split into three configurations. The entire track, the Gesamtstrecke (see map above) was 28.3 kilometres in length, composed of the Nordschleife (22.8 km), the Südschleife (7.7 km), and the Betonschleife – the latter a short 2 kilometer warm-up loop around the pit area. The lengths of the two segments, when considered separately, add up to more than the whole, since each circuit also incorporated some parts of the Betonschleife.

Timing entities
Along with races and timing events under the rules of their respective sanctioning bodies, the operators of the track have instituted official rules as of 2019 that govern the measurement and certification of lap time on the Nordschleife, with measurement over the full length of the track timed with a flying start. Timekeeping is supervised by a notary and the vehicles are scrutineered with regard to their series-production state.

Timing by media
The German magazine sport auto publishes its "Supertest" of cars, in which the lap time (usually driven by editor-in-chief Horst von Saurma) at the Nordschleife is the most discussed result. The magazine also runs a challenge for the fastest lap time driven with a car that is road legal (TÜV) and registered in Germany. The road legality rule also applies for the tyres.

British motorcycle magazine Performance Bikes began testing their bikes in a regular feature at the Nordschleife in March 2007 and finished in December 2007. Bikes were tested by Dale Lomas and Brendan Keirle (then known only as "The Baron"). As with sport auto, all machines tested are road-legal (MOT) and shod with road-legal Bridgestone BT002 Pro Race tyres. To date there are 28 lap times published in the regular feature. As motorcycles are forbidden to participate in industry pool sessions and after-hours test sessions, Performance Bikes were forced to test during quiet mid-week tourist sessions, where speed limits apply in some sections. This means their lap times are measured from bridge to gantry (see below) and are approximately 22 seconds shorter than a full  Nordschleife lap.

Nordschleife runs are conducted or observed by various other media outlets, such as the British Evo Magazine or Auto Bild from Germany.

Timing by manufacturers
Manufacturers, especially those of sports cars, conduct their own timing runs and publish these for varying purposes. Manufacturers also lend support to private entities or media outlets.

Timing by private drivers
Some lap times are even claimed to have been done during tourist driving sessions. It is forbidden to race on tourist days. Additionally, there are two speed limits (one in Breidscheid, and one on "Döttinger Höhe") on tourist days.

Controversies
Nordschleife runs are not without sometimes prominent critics. The British motoring programme Top Gear used the Nordschleife for their challenges, often involving Sabine Schmitz. Top Gears James May, however, was very critical of the influence of Nordschleife lap timing, saying that it "corrupts performance when it is used by car makers to develop new models. Testing prototype cars on a circuit is nothing new, obviously: it's probably been going on since someone drove a horseless carriage onto a disused donkey derby track. But the 'Ring, through being communal and open to all, encourages a pointless scrabble for comparative lap times that isn't helping you or me." According to Popular Science, "beating the 'ring, and making a YouTube video to prove it, is about the best marketing move a sports car company can make, even one that plans to roll only a double-digits'-worth of cars out of its production facility."

The views and definitions differ among automakers and also among journalists. According to Porsche, the Porsche 918 Spyder did set a "Nurburgring record for a street-legal automobile", while the car landed on place 3 on this list behind two Radical SR8. With roof reinforced for safety reasons and observed by sport auto, the record was widely reported by the media. Magazines like Car and Driver and the wider automotive industry declared the worldwide street-legal Porsche 918 the new record holder since the SR8 didn't meet full type-approval and only could get British single-vehicle approval.

Two months later, Nissan claimed, which was also widely reported in the media, a ring record for its Nissan GT-R Nismo as "world's fastest volume production car". Engineers later confessed that the car had been "specifically tuned for the Nurburgring" with significant changes from the standard car, including the addition of not road legal parts. The Nissan GT-R was fourth place on this list at the time.

Track lengths and timing
There are varying lap lengths. Therefore, not all of the lap times are comparable.

Full lap
Most laps are completed  shorter for safety reasons. Full uninterrupted flying laps can only be done in closed sessions and race events like Castrol-Haugg-Cup.

Bridge to gantry
During tourist driving sessions, the full main straight cannot be driven at speed due to the exit/entrance. These laps are usually timed "bridge to gantry", which is only 19.1 km (11.9 mi). The lap goes from the "bridge" at Antoniusbuche to the "gantry" (currently carrying Audi sponsorship) on Döttinger Höhe.

Lap times

Automobiles

Production/street-legal

A production vehicle is defined as "one that is put into mass production, as a model produced in large numbers and offered for sale to the public." VCA, the United Kingdom's national approval authority for new road vehicles defines a production vehicle as "a vehicle of a make, model and type mass produced by the vehicle manufacturer." Guinness World Records was reported to require a minimum of 30 and other lists within Wikipedia require at least 25 road legal cars built.  The Nürburgring is a public (toll-) road, and regulations of Germany and the EU apply. For the purpose of this list, a car is “street legal” if it is registered in at least one EU country for road use.

For new entries, this list requires an official manufacturer's press release for manufacturer-conducted tests. If the test has been conducted by an independent publication, an article in that publication is required. New entries require an original, uncut on-board video, showing the lap and the timing from start to finish. A statement that road legal OEM tyres have been used is required.

Non-series/non-road-legal

Competition

General Note: International motorsport sanctioning bodies used the 20.832 km Nordschleife variant in 1983 only.

Qualifying

Racing

Motorcycles

Racing

Bicycles

Rad am Ring Time Trial (22 km)

See also
List of Nordschleife lap times (racing)

References

External links
Database with lap times of racing events and magazine tests
Castrol-Haugg-Cup lap records of various classes recorded on Nordschleife 1990 - 2006
One of the oldest/largest lists of Nordschleife lap times, with track length and average lap speed
Lap times achieved in public sessions

Motorsport in Germany
Nurburgring Nordschleife lap times